Koszalin Voivodeship may also refer to:

Koszalin Voivodeship (1950–1975)
Koszalin Voivodeship (1975–1998)